Vaikunta Baliga College of Law (Formerly called as the Udupi Law College) was established in the year 1957 by late Dr.T.M.A.Pai. The college was named after Late Sri B.Vaikunta Baliga, a legal luminary and then minister of Law, Government of Mysore. It is affiliated to Karnataka State Law University.

List of alumni 

 D. V. Sadananda Gowda, former Chief Minister of Karnataka, Former Union Minister and Member of Parliament.
 V. Dhananjay Kumar, former Union Minister

References

Law schools in Karnataka
Universities and colleges in Udupi district